The Inquiry Film: A Report on the Mackenzie Valley Pipeline is a Canadian documentary film, directed by Jesse Nishihata and released in 1977. The film explored the First Nations perspective on Thomas R. Berger's Mackenzie Valley Pipeline Inquiry of the mid-1970s.

CBC Television aired the film in its entirety the day before the release of Berger's report, one of the first times that it ever broadcast a documentary film which it had not exercised direct editorial control during the filmmaking process.

The film won the Canadian Film Award for Best Feature Length Documentary in 1977.

References

External links
 
, posted by the Prince of Wales Northern Heritage Centre

1977 films
1977 documentary films
Canadian documentary films
Documentary films about Indigenous rights in Canada
Best Documentary Film Genie and Canadian Screen Award winners
1970s English-language films
1970s Canadian films